Roy Chicago (John Akintola Ademuwagun) (died 5 February 1989) was an indigene of Ikare-Akoko in Ondo State, Nigeria. He had two children Bolajoko and Kayode Akintola. He was a musician and band leader who played in the Highlife style, introducing talking drums into the musical style. He moved to Lagos from Ibadan in the late 1950s, and was most popular during the 1960s. In contrast to Victor Olaiya, whose music was based on Ghanaian melodies and progressions, Roy Chicago based his music on Nigerian indigenous themes and folklores. He was one of the highlife musicians who changed his name to a purely Western form, perhaps to make it sound more cool.

Career

Roy Chicago started playing in the 1950s at Central Hotel on Adamasingba Street in Ibadan before moving to Lagos. In his early years, Roy Chicago was helped by Bobby Benson who guided him in playing the saxophone and leading a band. After Nigeria gained independence in 1960, Roy Chicago became increasingly successful with hits such as "Iyawo Pankeke", "Are owo niesa Yoyo gbe" and "Keregbe emu".

In the 1960s, Victor Olaiya's International All Stars and Roy Chicago's Abalabi Rhythm Dandies were two of the leading highlife bands in Nigeria, both led by graduates of the Bobby Benson Orchestra. Roy Chicago became well known at the Abalabi Hotel in Mushin, introducing the talking drum into highlife. With the Nigerian Civil War of 1967–1970, highlife became less popular at the expense of Yoruba-derived Jùjú music, since the Igbo people from the breakaway regions of eastern Nigeria had run many of the top highlife bands. The result was an increase in popularity of the easy-going and less rigid juju form of music at the expense of highlife.
At a low point in Chicago's career in the 1970s, Bobby Benson helped again by providing musical equipment and giving him a place to stay in Surulere.

Music

Roy Chicago combined the trumpet and saxophone with vocals. Playing with Bobby Benson in the 1950s, he performed ball room dance and highlife, fox trot, tango, waltz, quick step, jive and Latin American music.  His sidemen included tenor sax player Etim Udo and trumpeter Marco Bazz.
Roy Chicago's highlife style had its accent anchored on rhythm. He explained Nigerian folksongs with vocals by Tunde Osofisan, one of the finest singers on the highlife scene.
Although his style could not be called a jazz derivative, there are blue notes in his saxophone parts and "cool" jazz intonations and phrases, which are closer to traditional Yoruba music than to highlife.

Legacy

Former members of his band included trumpeter/vocalist Cardinal Rex Jim Lawson, who was of mixed Igbo and Kalabari background. Lawson apprenticed with Bobby Benson, Victor Olaiya, and Roy Chicago before striking out on his own with a unique blend of Igbo lyrics sung over Kalabari rhythms.
Jimi Solanke, the playwright, poet and folk singer, was another singer with his band.
The band's recording of his composition "Onile-Gogoro" became one of the most memorable highlife hits of the 1960s.

Alaba Pedro, a guitarist from Roy Chicago's band, went on to play with Orlando Julius Aremu Olusanya Ekemode, O.J. to his friends.
Alaba Pedro joined Roy Chicago in 1961 and stayed with the band until the time of the civil war, when it disbanded in 1969. He recalls that "It was a highly disciplined band ... The band was versatile and could play almost all types of music, but ... highlife [was] its specialty, which relied more on Nigerian melodies with rhythms rooted in indigenous elements."
Peter King, one of Nigeria's greatest tenor sax players, started with Roy Chicago's band in Lagos before going to England to study music.

External links

References

Year of birth missing
1989 deaths
Nigerian trumpeters
Nigerian saxophonists
20th-century Nigerian male singers
Yoruba musicians
20th-century Nigerian musicians
Musicians from Ibadan
20th-century saxophonists
20th-century trumpeters